The Ranks and insignia of German Women's Auxiliary Services were the ranks given to women who served in the German military and paramilitary forces during World War II.

Wehrmacht
The first female auxiliary service in the Wehrmacht was the Army signals communications female auxiliaries, formed on 1 October 1940. Others followed suit, in the army and in the other services. Until December 1941, recruitment was by volunteer enlistment, but by that date unmarried women in the age group 18–40 years could be drafted into auxiliary service. All female auxiliary services were uniformed and under military discipline, with free rations, quarters and clothing. Yet, they were paid according to civil service pay rates and were not considered members of the armed forces, but auxiliaries of the armed forces. Their ranks did not correspond to military ranks.

Army

Army signals communications female auxiliaries.

Navy

Air force
 (FMDH)
Female air warning service auxiliaries 

 (LNH)

Female anti-aircraft auxiliaries 1944.

Civil defence air-raid warning service female auxiliaries.

On 29 November 1944 all female auxiliary organizations, except the Civil defence air-raid warning service female auxiliaries, were merged into one corps, the Wehrmacht Female Auxiliary Corps.

During the war, the female civilian employees of the Ordnungspolizei were augmented with drafted female police auxiliaries;  performed office work,  worked with signals communications, while  drove automobiles.

Rank insignia for Female Police Auxiliaries was introduced in 1944.

Female fire fighting auxiliaries were drafted into the fire service from 1943.

Rank insignia for Female Fire Fighting Auxiliaries was introduced in 1944.

Paramilitary

Female Reich Labour Service, Auxiliary War Service
The auxiliary war service of RAD was prolonged with another six months in April 1944, and at the end of November all time limits for service were removed. The majority of the additional draft of 150,000 young women were to serve in the Luftwaffe air defenses. They formed special RAD-Flak units with RAD uniforms. While female Wehrmacht personnel saw extensive deployment throughout German-occupied Europe, members of the RAD Auxiliary War Service only served within the borders of Germany.

References

Bibliography 

 
 
 
 
 
 
 
 
 
 
 
 

Women's Auxiliary Services